{{DISPLAYTITLE:C4H6O3}}
The molecular formula C4H6O3 may refer to:

 Acetic anhydride
 Acetoacetic acid
 Dioxanones
 p-Dioxanone
 Trimethylene carbonate
 trans-4-Hydroxycrotonic acid
 α-Ketobutyric acid
 2-Methyl-3-oxopropanoic acid
 Methyl pyruvate
 Propylene carbonate
 Succinic semialdehyde